Offenhauser Sales Corporation is an American manufacturer of racing, custom car and  performance automotive parts founded around 1946 by Fred C. Offehhauser, nephew of Fred H. Offehhauser, co-designer of the Offy racing engine. As of 2016, the third generation President of the company is Fred C. "Tay" Offenhauser, grand nephew of founder Fred C. Offenhauser. After working with his uncle Fred H. Offenhauser in the 1930s and 1940s, Fred C. served the US Navy during World War II, and returned home to found his speed parts business. The company is unrelated to the Offy or Offenhauser racing engine, and after a suit over the use of the name, Offenhauser Sales Corporation was allowed to use the family name, but not the racing engine nickname "Offy".

References

Manufacturing companies established in 1946
Companies based in Los Angeles
Auto parts suppliers of the United States
Automotive motorsports and performance companies
1946 establishments in California